

Barnaslingan is a  high hill in County Dublin, Ireland.  It is most noted for the geological feature known as The Scalp ( or "cleft") that lies to the west of the summit. Samuel Lewis, in A Topographical Dictionary of Ireland (1837), described it thus: “A deep natural chasm in the mountain, forming a defile with lofty and shelving ramparts on each side, from which large detached masses of granite many tons of weight have fallen, on each side large masses of detached rock are heaped together in wild confusion, apparently arrested in their descent, and threatening at every moment to crush the traveller by their fall”.

The Scalp is a narrow glacial valley formed approximately 12,000 years ago during the last ice age. During this period a massive ice sheet covered the Irish Sea extending inland over the Dublin-Wicklow Mountains. As the ice melted several glacial lakes formed, including one at Enniskerry, enclosed by the mountains and the ice sheet. The pressure created by this volume of water pressing against the bedrock eventually found a weak point and gouged out the channel now known as The Scalp. The same process created similar features in nearby County Wicklow at the Glen of the Downs and at the Rocky Valley north of the Great Sugar Loaf.  On account of its status as an example of a glacial lake overflow, it is listed as an Area of Scientific Interest. The steep, rocky slopes are home to a herd of feral goats and the area is also a habitat for deer and badgers.

The route of the R117 road passes through The Scalp between Kilternan and Enniskerry. Even though the floor of the valley is quite narrow, a small number of buildings are situated along the roadside. The most prominent of these is the Scalp Service Station; prior to 1963 this was a ballroom called “The New Era”. Another house, now a private residence, was a tea room called “Butler's Tea House”.

Overlooking the area is the Kilternan Golf and Country Club which first opened as a hotel in 1970. It is built around a nineteenth-century house called Springfield which was once the home of the poet and mathematician George Darley (1795-1846). In 2001 the hotel was purchased by the hotelier and developer Hugh O'Regan who commenced a major redevelopment and expansion of the property. Although the work is 90 percent complete, Mr O'Regan's companies went into liquidation in 2009 and its future is uncertain. The land around the hotel is also the site of a dry ski slope and headquarters of the Ski Club of Ireland; it continues to operate.

Barnaslingan lies within a Coillte-owned forest recreation area which is managed by the Dublin Mountains Partnership. There are a number of waymarked walking trails in the woods as well as a permanent orienteering course. Barnaslingan is also traversed by the Dublin Mountains Way.

References

Notes

Bibliography

External links
Barnaslingan at the Dublin Mountains Partnership

Mountains and hills of Dún Laoghaire–Rathdown